Volujac may refer to te following places:

Bosnia and Herzegovina
 Volujac, Bosnia and Herzegovina

Serbia
 Volujac (Užice)
 Volujac (Šabac)